Marjan Pipenbaher (born 22 August 1957) is a Slovenian structural engineer and bridge specialist.

Career
Pipenbaher graduated from the Faculty of Civil Engineering, University of Maribor in 1981. From 1980, he worked at the Gradis Design Office where he participated in designing of several large bridges and viaducts constructed by Gradis. In 1990, he and Viktor Markelj founded Ponting Bridges, a Slovenian studio for structural engineering, focusing mainly on bridge structures, with headquarters in Maribor. The practice is led by Markelj and Pipenbaher, and has constructed many high-profile bridges. Since 2002, he is also founder and CEO of specialized design and research company Pipenbaher Consulting Engineers.   

His high-profile bridges include Pelješac Bridge in Croatia (2022), Nissibi Euphrates Bridge in Turkey (2015), and Črni Kal Viaduct in Slovenia (2004). He lives in Slovenska Bistrica. 

He is a lecturer at the Faculty of Civil Engineering in Maribor since 2000, in the field of prestressed concrete structures and bridges. He began there as an assistant in 1986.

Major projects
Major projects, by year of completion and ordered by type, are:

Bridges
 Carinthian bridge, Maribor, Slovenia (1996)
 Črni Kal Viaduct, Slovenia (2004)
 Viaduct Bivje, Slovenia (2004)
 Millennium Bridge, Podgorica, Montenegro (2006)
 Viaduct Bonifika, Koper, Slovenia (2007)
 Viaduct Dobruša, Slovenia (2010)
 Peračica viaducts, Slovenia (2012)
 Giborim bridge, Haifa, Israel (2012)
 Nissibi Euphrates Bridge, highway Adiyaman - Diyarbakir, Turkey (2015) 
 High speed railway bridge no. 10, HSR Tel Aviv - Jerusalem, Israel (2017)
 New Kömürhan Bridge, Turkey (2021)
 Pelješac Bridge, Croatia (2022)

Pedestrian and cyclist bridges
 Footbridge in Ptuj, Slovenia (1997)

Current
 Highway bridge and parallel pedestrian bridge over Krka river, Slovenia (detailed design)

Selected works

Awards 
 2022 Kolos awards for exceptional achievements in civil engineering for the Pelješac Bridge project  
 2021 The Newspaper Finances' Award for Special Achievements  
 2019 Jožef Mrak Award for Pelješac Bridge
 2019 Honorary City Certificate of Slovenska Bistrica to Dr. Viktor Markelj and Marjan Pipenbaher
 2004 UM Award 2004: Golden recognition award to Mr. Marjan Pipenbaher and Mr. Viktor Markelj
 1999 Award CSS of CCIS to Footbridge in Ptuj

References

External links 
 Ponting Bridges Website
 Pipenbaher Consulting Engineers Website

1957 births
Living people
Engineers from Ljubljana
People from Slovenska Bistrica
Structural engineers
Viaduct engineers
Bridge engineers